(English: This Chest, Shoot Love) is the twenty-eighth single by the Japanese Pop-rock band Porno Graffitti. It was released on September 9, 2009.

Track listing

References

2009 singles
Porno Graffitti songs
2009 songs
SME Records singles